Rebu may refer to:

 Rebu, Estonia
 Abba Rebu (reigned 1855–1859), Ethiopian king
 O Rebu, a Brazilian late night telenovela

See also
 Rebus (disambiguation)